This is a list of flag bearers who have represented Peru at the Olympics.

Flag bearers carry the national flag of their country at the opening ceremony of the Olympic Games.

See also
Peru at the Olympics

References

Peru at the Olympics
Peru
Olympic flagbearers
Olympic flagbearers